Wherever You Are may refer to:

Film 
 Wherever You Are (film), a 2008 film by Robert Margolies
 Wherever You Are (1988 film), a Polish film by Krzysztof Zanussi

Albums 
 Wherever You Are (David Mead album), or the title song, 2005
 Wherever You Are (Sami Yusuf album), or the title song, 2010
 Wherever You Are (Third Day album), 2005
 Live: Wherever You Are, an album by Jack Ingram, or the title song (see below), 2006
 Wherever You Are, an EP by Eric Dill, 2012

Songs 
 "Wherever You Are" (Jack Ingram song)
 "Wherever You Are" (Kodaline song)
 "Wherever You Are" (Mic Geronimo song)
 "Wherever You Are" (Military Wives song)
 "Where Ever U Are", a song by Cedric Gervais featuring Jessica Sutta
 "Wherever You Are", a remix of "Donde Quiera Que Estés" by Selena and Barrio Boyzz
 "Wherever You Are", a song by The Doubleclicks from their 2012 EP Christmas Ain't About Me
 "Wherever You Are", a song by Neil Finn from One Nil
 "Wherever You Are", a song from the film Pooh's Grand Adventure: The Search for Christopher Robin
 "Wherever You Are", a song by Kesha from the 2012 Album Warrior
 "Wherever You Are", a song by Mary Chapin Carpenter from Party Doll and Other Favorites
 "Wherever You Are (I Feel Love)", a song by Laava (Fernanda Brandão)
 "Wherever You Are" , a song by 5 Seconds of Summer released as a bonus track on some versions of their eponymous debut album
"Wherever you are", a song by One Ok Rock from their album Niche Syndrome